Marcos Curado (born 9 May 1995) is an Argentine professional footballer who plays as a centre-back for Italian  club  Perugia.

He also holds Italian citizenship.

Career
Curado's first appearance for Argentine Primera División club Arsenal de Sarandí came on 11 August 2014 when he was on the bench during a win over Estudiantes. His first appearance in a match for Arsenal was in the following season, 2015, in a draw against Unión Santa Fe. He played in a further sixteen league matches in 2015 before participating in another sixteen in the 2016 Argentine Primera División season. In July 2018, Curado was signed by Serie A's Genoa. He was immediately loaned to Avellino of Serie B. Despite featuring in a friendly against Roma on 20 July, Curado left Avellino to join Crotone on loan in August.

After seventeen total games for Crotone, Curado returned to Genoa at the end of June. However, on 10 July, Crotone announced a fresh loan deal for the centre-back. He'd appear twelve times for them in 2019–20. On 2 October 2020, Curado was again loaned out by Genoa as he agreed to join Frosinone of Serie B. He made his debut a day later, playing the full duration of a two-goal victory away to Venezia.

On 7 July 2021, he joined Perugia on loan with an obligation to buy.

Career statistics
.

References

External links
 

1995 births
Living people
Sportspeople from Mar del Plata
Argentine footballers
Italian footballers
Argentine people of Italian descent
Citizens of Italy through descent
Association football defenders
Argentine expatriate footballers
Expatriate footballers in Italy
Argentine expatriate sportspeople in Italy
Argentine Primera División players
Serie B players
Arsenal de Sarandí footballers
Genoa C.F.C. players
U.S. Avellino 1912 players
F.C. Crotone players
Frosinone Calcio players
A.C. Perugia Calcio players